Petri Eteläniemi (born 2 April 1968) is a Finnish sports shooter. He competed at the 1992 Summer Olympics and the 1996 Summer Olympics.

References

1968 births
Living people
Finnish male sport shooters
Olympic shooters of Finland
Shooters at the 1992 Summer Olympics
Shooters at the 1996 Summer Olympics
Sportspeople from Pori